The Boss of Rustler's Roost is a 1928 American silent Western film directed by Leo D. Maloney and starring Eugenia Gilbert, Ben Corbett and Tom London.

Cast
 Don Coleman as 'Smiler' Cavanaugh 
 Eugenia Gilbert as Fay Everman
 Ben Corbett as 'Tip' Reardon 
 Tom London as 'Pronto Giles', the Foreman 
 Al Hart as Henry Everman
 Dick Hatton as Bill Everman 
 Frank Clark as Jud Porter 
 William Bertram as Sheriff Drain 
 Chet Ryan as Ranger

References

External links
 

1928 films
1928 Western (genre) films
Films directed by Leo D. Maloney
American black-and-white films
Pathé Exchange films
Silent American Western (genre) films
1920s English-language films
1920s American films